Bregmatomyrma is a genus of ants in the subfamily Formicinae. It contains the single species Bregmatomyrma carnosa, known only from queens from Borneo.

References

External links

Formicinae
Monotypic ant genera
Hymenoptera of Asia